Anthony Vandyke Copley Fielding (22 November 1787 – 3 March 1855), commonly called Copley Fielding, was an English painter born in Sowerby, near Halifax, and famous for his watercolour landscapes.  At an early age Fielding became a pupil of John Varley.  In 1810 he became an associate exhibitor in the Old Water-colour Society, in 1813 a full member and in 1831 President of that body (later known as the Royal Society of Watercolours), until his death.  In 1824 he won a gold medal at the Paris Salon alongside Richard Parkes Bonington and John Constable.  He also engaged largely in teaching the art and made ample profits.  He later moved to Park Crescent in Worthing and died in the town in March 1855.

Copley Fielding was a painter of much elegance, taste and accomplishment and has always been highly popular with purchasers.  He painted a vast number of all sorts of views (occasionally in oil-colour) including marine subjects.  Examples of his work is held by the Victoria and Albert Museum and other major museums in Britain.  Among the engraved specimens of his art is the Annual of British Landscape Scenery, published in 1839.

Gallery

References

S.C. Kaines Smith, 'A.V.C. Fielding', OWS Club, III, 1925-6, pp 8–30
John Ramm, 'In Search of Nature: the Life & Works of Anthony Vandyke Copley Fielding PRWS', 'Antique Dealer & Collectors Guide', May 1999, Vol 52, No.10

External links

 Works by Copley-Fielding at the Tate Gallery
 Works by Copley-Fielding at the Louvre
 Works by Copley-Fielding at The Queen's Art Collection
 Works by Copley-Fielding at Victoria & Albert Museum
 , an engraving by W Floyd for Fisher's Drawing Room Scrap Book, 1832, with a poetical illustration by Letitia Elizabeth Landon.
 , an engraving by Thomas Jeavons for Fisher's Drawing Room Scrap Book, 1833 (with a humorous poem by Letitia Elizabeth Landon on the difficulties of writing to order on unknown subjects).

1787 births
1855 deaths
19th-century English painters
English male painters
Landscape painters
English watercolourists
19th-century English male artists